Coleotechnites florae, the coleotechnites flower moth, is a moth of the family Gelechiidae. It is found in North America, where it has been recorded from Alabama, Alberta, Arkansas, British Columbia, Florida, Georgia, Indiana, Louisiana, Maryland, Massachusetts, Michigan, Minnesota, Mississippi, Montana, North Carolina, Oklahoma, Saskatchewan, South Carolina, Tennessee, Texas and Washington.

The larvae are known to feed on Pinus contorta.

References

Moths described in 1961
Coleotechnites